Anomochlooideae is a subfamily of the true grass family Poaceae. It is sister to all the other grasses. It includes perennial herbs that grow on the shaded floor of forests in the Neotropics. There are two genera, Anomochloa and Streptochaeta, each in its own tribe.

This subfamily is the most early-diverging lineage of the grasses:

References 

Poaceae subfamilies
Grasses of North America
Grasses of South America